BRIC is a grouping acronym referring to the developing countries of Brazil, Russia, India, and China, which are identified as rising economic powers. It is typically rendered as "the BRIC," "the BRIC countries," "the BRIC economies," or alternatively as the "Big Four." The name has since been changed to BRICS after the addition of South Africa in 2010.

The term was coined by economist Jim O'Neill in 2001 as an acronym for the four countries he identified as being at a similar stage of newly advanced economic development. In 2009, the leaders of the four countries held their first summit and in 2010 BRIC became a formal institution. South Africa began efforts to join the BRIC grouping and received an invitation on December 24, 2010. O'Neill commented to the 2010 summit that South Africa, at a population of under 50 million people, was just too small as an economy to join the BRICS ranks.

The original aim of BRICS was the establishment of an equitable, democratic and multi-polar world order, but later BRICS became a political organization, especially after South Africa joined.

Thesis
The economic potential of Brazil, Russia, India and China is such that they could become among the four most dominant economies by 2050. The thesis was proposed by Jim O'Neill, global economist at Goldman Sachs. These countries encompass over 25% of the world's land coverage and 40% of the world's population and hold a combined GDP (PPP) of $20 trillion. On almost every scale, they would be the largest entity on the global stage. These four countries are among the biggest and fastest-growing emerging markets.{Incal 2011}

They have taken steps to increase their political cooperation, mainly as a way of influencing the United States position on major trade accords, or, through the implicit threat of political cooperation, as a way of extracting political concessions from the United States, such as the proposed nuclear cooperation with India.

"Dreaming with BRICS: The Path to 2050" (2003)
The BRIC thesis recognizes that Brazil, Russia, India and China have changed their political systems to embrace global capitalism. Goldman Sachs predicts that China and India, respectively, will become the dominant global suppliers of manufactured goods and services, while Brazil and Russia will become similarly dominant as suppliers of raw materials. Of the four countries, Brazil remains the only polity that can continue all elements, meaning manufacturing, services, and resource supplying simultaneously. Cooperation is thus hypothesized to be a logical next step among the BRICs because Brazil and Russia together form the logical commodity suppliers.

In 2016, an economist from Australia predicted that in 2050, based on Gross Domestic Product per capita spending, China will be the first and followed by India and the United States. Indonesia which nowadays does not belong to BRIC countries will jump from 9th position to 4th position. And Brazil will be in the fifth position. It is due to the global economic center is shifting from the Atlantic to the Asia Pacific region.

Follow-up report (2004)
The Goldman Sachs global economics team released a follow-up report to its initial BRIC study in 2004. The report states that in BRIC nations, the number of people with an annual income over a threshold of $3,000 will double in number within three years and reach 800 million people within a decade. This predicts a massive rise in the size of the middle class in these nations. In 2025, it is calculated that the number of people in BRIC nations earning over $15,000 may reach over 200 million people. This indicates that a huge pickup in demand will not be restricted to basic goods but impact higher-priced goods as well. According to the report, first China and then a decade later India will begin to dominate the world economy.

Yet despite the balance of growth swinging so decisively towards the BRIC economies, the average level of individuals in the more advanced economies will continue to far outstrip the BRIC economic average for the foreseeable future.

The report also highlights India's inefficient energy consumption and mentions the dramatic under-representation of these economies in the global capital markets. The report also emphasizes the enormous populations that exist within the BRIC nations, which makes it relatively easy for their aggregate wealth to eclipse the G6, while per-capita income levels remain far below the norm of today's industrialized countries. This phenomenon, too, will affect world markets as multinational corporations will attempt to take advantage of the enormous potential markets in the BRICs by producing, for example, far cheaper automobiles and other manufactured goods affordable to the consumers within the BRICs in lieu of the luxury models that currently bring the most income to automobile manufacturers. India and China have already started making their presence felt in the service and manufacturing sector respectively in the global arena. Developed economies of the world have already taken serious note of this fact.

(2007) Second Follow-up report
This report compiled by lead authors Tushar Poddar and Eva Yi gives insight into "India's Rising Growth Potential". It reveals updated projection figures attributed to the rising growth trends in India over the last four years. Goldman Sachs asserts that "India's influence on the world economy will be bigger and quicker than implied in our previously published BRICs research". They noted significant areas of research and development, and expansion that is happening in the country, which will lead to the prosperity of the growing middle-class.

India has 10 of the 30 fastest-growing urban areas in the world. Based on current trends, an estimated a massive 700 million people will move to cities by 2050. This will have significant implications for demand for urban infrastructure, real estate, and services.

In the revised 2007 figures, based on increased and sustaining growth, more inflows into foreign direct investment, Goldman Sachs predicts that "from 2007 to 2020, India's GDP per capita in US$ terms will quadruple", and that the Indian economy will surpass the United States (in US$) by 2043. At the same time, the report indicated that Russia, while continuing its dominance of the European energy market, would continue to struggle economically, as its population declines.

"EM Equity in Two Decades: A Changing Landscape" (2010)
According to a 2010 report from Goldman Sachs, China might surpass the United States in equity market capitalization terms by 2030 and become the single largest equity market in the world. By 2020, America's GDP might be only slightly larger than China's GDP. Together, the four BRICs may account for 41% of the world's market capitalization by 2030, the report said. In late 2010, China surpassed Japan's GDP for the first time, with China's GDP standing at $5.88 trillion compared to Japan's $5.47 trillion. China thus became the world's second-largest economy after the United States.

According to The National Institute of Economic and Social Research (NIESR) based on International Monetary Fund figures, in 2012 Brazil has become the sixth-biggest economy in the world by overtaking United Kingdom with $2.52 trillion and $2.48 trillion, respectively. In 2010, the Brazilian economy was worth $2.09 trillion and UK with $2.25 trillion. Significant increase is caused by Brazilian economic boom on high food and oil prices. Since the beginning of the Great Recession, in Q3 2013 economy of Brazil contracted by 0.5 percent from the previous quarter as the first contraction since Q1 2009.

After Standard & Poor's (S&P) stated that India's growth outlook could deteriorate if policymaking and governance do not improve, in June 2012 Fitch Ratings cut its credit outlook to negative from stable with maintained its BBB- rating, the lowest investment-grade rating. A week before Fitch released the rating, S&P said India could become the first of the BRIC countries to lose investment-grade status.

For the year 2013, China for the first time surpassed $4 trillion of world trade and become as world's largest trading country, consist of: export $2.21 trillion and import $1.95 trillion. While the United States for 11 months of 2013 world trade figure totaling $3.5 trillion and seems cannot beat China. China world trade balance in 2013 surplus by almost $260 billion a 12.8 percent increased from last year.

Goldman Sachs has quietly closed down its BRIC fund after lost 88 percent of its asset value since 2010, instead channeling the fund into emerging markets countries. Historically, Jim O'Neill, the inventor of the term "BRIC," was the former chief economist of Goldman Sachs. The head of emerging markets for Morgan Stanley Investment Management, Ruchir Sharma, has released a book in 2012: Breakout Nations which mentioned that it is hard to sustain rapid growth for more than a decade.

Based on a March 2011 Forbes report, the BRIC countries counted 301 billionaires among their combined populations, exceeding the number of billionaires in Europe, which stood at 300 in 2011.

Statistics

A Goldman Sachs paper published in December 2005 explained why Mexico was not included in the original BRICs. The Economist publishes an annual table of socio-economic national statistics in its "Pocket World in Figures". Extrapolating the global rankings from their 2008 Edition for the BRIC countries and economies in relation to various categories provides an interesting touchstone in relation to the economic underpinnings of the BRIC thesis. It also illustrates how, despite their divergent economic bases, the economic indicators are remarkably similar in global rankings between the different economies. It also suggests that, while economic arguments can be made for linking Mexico into the BRIC thesis, the case for including South Korea looks considerably weaker.

General statistics

Goldman Sachs prediction

Note: All data above is from Goldman Sachs, except the 2030 USDA column is data from U.S. Department of Agriculture (2030 USDA) about World's 20 Largest Economies in 2030, but only 16 match with Goldman Sachs data. In 2030 USDA, Mexico and Indonesia will topple South Korea (please see Section Proposed inclusions). There is no South Africa of BRIC S in the above table. In 2030, the sole country from Africa is Nigeria and the US is still number one, but China almost overtakes the US.

The following three tables are lists of economies by incremental GDP from 2006 to 2050 by Goldman Sachs. They illustrate that the BRICs and N11 nations are replacing G7 nations as the main contributors to the world's economic growth. From 2020 to 2050, nine of the ten largest countries by incremental GDP are occupied by the BRICs and N11 nations, in which the United States remains to be the only G7 member as one of the three biggest contributors to the global economic growth.

At the World Economic Forum 2011, there were 365 corporate executives from BRIC and other emerging nations out of 1000 participants. It was a record number of executives from emerging markets. Nomura Holdings Inc's co-head of global investment banking said that "It's a reflection of where economic power and influence is starting to move." The International Monetary Fund estimated emerging markets might expand 6.5 percent in 2011, more than double the 2.5 percent rate for developed countries. BRIC's takeover made record by 22 percent of global deals or increase by 74 percent in one year and more than quadrupled in the last five years.

According to The World Bank Doing Business report 2019 the BRIC economies introduced a total of 21 reforms, with getting electricity and trading across borders the most common areas of improvement.

History

The BRIC alliance has its roots in the Russia-India-China (RIC) strategic triangle, which was envisaged by Russian prime minister Yevgeny Primakov in the 1990s.

Various sources refer to a purported "original" BRIC agreement that predates the Goldman Sachs thesis. Some of these sources claim that President Vladimir Putin of Russia was the driving force behind this original cooperative coalition of developing BRIC countries. However, thus far, no text has been made public of any formal agreement to which all four BRIC states are signatories. This does not mean, however, that they have not reached a multitude of bilateral or even quadrilateral agreements. Evidence of agreements of this type are abundant and are available on the foreign ministry websites of each of the four countries. Trilateral agreements and frameworks made among the BRICs include the Shanghai Cooperation Organisation (member states include Russia and China, observers include India) and the IBSA Trilateral Forum, which unites Brazil, India, and South Africa in annual dialogues. Also important to note is the G-20 coalition of developing states which includes all the BRICs.

Also, because of the popularity of the Goldman Sachs thesis "BRIC", this term has sometimes been extended whereby "BRICK" (K for South Korea), "BRIMC" (M for Mexico), "BRICA" (GCC Arab countries—Saudi Arabia, Qatar, Kuwait, Bahrain, Oman and the United Arab Emirates) and "BRICET" (including Eastern Europe and Turkey) have become more generic marketing terms to refer to these emerging markets.

In an August 2010 op-ed, Jim O'Neill of Goldman Sachs argued that Africa could be considered the next BRIC. Analysts from rival banks have sought to move beyond the BRIC concept, by introducing their own groupings of emerging markets. Proposals include CIVETs (Colombia, Indonesia, Vietnam, Egypt, Turkey and South Africa), the EAGLES (Emerging and Growth-Leading Economies) and the 7 percent club (which includes those countries which have averaged economic growth of at least 7 percent a year).

South Africa sought BRIC membership since 2009 and the process for formal admission began as early as August 2010. South Africa was officially admitted as a BRIC nation on December 24, 2010, after being invited by China and the other BRIC countries to join the group. The capital "S" in BRICS stands for South Africa. President Jacob Zuma attend the BRICS summit in Sanya in April 2011 as a full member. South Africa stands at a unique position to influence African economic growth and investment. According to Jim O'Neill of Goldman Sachs who originally coined the term, Africa's combined current gross domestic product is reasonably similar to that of Brazil and Russia, and slightly above that of India. South Africa is a "gateway" to Southern Africa and Africa in general as the most developed African country. China is South Africa's largest trading partner, and India wants to increase commercial ties with Africa. South Africa is also Africa's largest economy, but as number 31 in global GDP economies it is far behind its new partners.

Jim O'Neill expressed surprise when South Africa joined BRIC since South Africa's economy is a quarter of the size of Russia's (the least economically powerful BRIC nation). He believed that the potential was there but did not anticipate inclusion of South Africa at this stage. Martyn Davies, a South African emerging markets expert, argued that the decision to invite South Africa made little commercial sense but was politically astute given China's attempts to establish a foothold in Africa. Further, South Africa's inclusion in BRICS may translate to greater South African support for China in global fora. He has great belief that the "S" in "BRICS" could be replaced eventually by SADC.

African credentials are important geopolitically, giving BRICS a four-continent breadth, influence and trade opportunities. South Africa's addition is a deft political move that further enhances BRICS' power and status. In the original essay that coined the term, Goldman Sachs did not argue that the BRICs would organize themselves into an economic bloc, or a formal trading association which this move signifies.

Marketing

The BRIC term is also used by companies who refer to the four named countries as key to their emerging markets strategies. By comparison, the reduced acronym IC would not be attractive, although the term "Chindia" is often used. BRIC's study specifically focuses on large countries, not necessarily the wealthiest or the most productive and was never intended to be an investment thesis. If investors read Goldman's research carefully and agreed with the conclusions, then they would gain exposure to Asian debt and equity markets rather than to Latin America. According to estimates provided by the USDA, the wealthiest regions outside of the G6 in 2015 will be Hong Kong, South Korea and Singapore. Combined with China and India, these five economies are likely to be the world's five most influential economies outside of the G6.

On the other hand, when the "R" in BRIC is extended beyond Russia and is used as a loose term to include all of Eastern Europe as well, then the BRIC story becomes more compelling. At issue are the multiple serious problems which confront Russia (potentially unstable government, environmental degradation, critical lack of modern infrastructure, etc.), and the comparatively much lower growth rate seen in Brazil. However, Brazil's lower growth rate obscures the fact that the country is wealthier than China or India on a per-capita basis, has a more developed and global integrated financial system and has an economy potentially more diverse than the other BRICs due to its raw material and manufacturing potential. Many other Eastern European countries, such as Poland, Romania, the Czech Republic, Slovakia, Hungary, Bulgaria, and several others were able to continually sustain high economic growth rates and do not experience some of the problems that Russia experiences or experience them to a lesser extent. In terms of GDP per capita in 2008, Brazil ranked 64th, Russia 42nd, India 113th, and China 89th. By comparison, South Korea ranked 24th and Singapore 3rd.

Brazil's stock market, the Bovespa, has gone from approximately 9,000 in September 2002 to over 70,000 in May 2008. Government policies have favored investment (lowering interest rates), retiring foreign debt and expanding growth, and a reformulation of the tax system is being voted in the congress. The British author and researcher Mark Kobayashi-Hillary wrote a book in 2007 titled Building a Future with BRICs for European publisher Springer Verlag that examines the growth of the BRICs region and its effect on global sourcing. Contributors to the book include Nandan Nilekani, and Shiv Nadar.

International law
Brazilian lawyer and author Adler Martins has published a paper called "Contratos Internacionais entre os países do BRIC" (International Agreements Among BRIC countries) which highlights the international conventions ratified by the BRIC countries, which allow them to maintain trade and investment activities safely within the group. Martin's study is being further developed by the Federal University of the Minas Gerais State, in Brazil.

Financial diversification
It has been argued that geographic diversification would eventually generate superior risk-adjusted returns for long-term global investors by reducing overall portfolio risk while capturing some of the higher rates of return offered by the emerging markets of Asia, Eastern Europe and Latin America. By doing so, these institutional investors have contributed to the financial and economic development of key emerging nations such as Brazil, India, China, and Russia. For global investors, India and China constitute both large-scale production platforms and reservoirs of new consumers, whereas Russia is viewed essentially as an exporter of oil and commodities- Brazil and Latin America being somehow "in the middle".

Criticism
Academics and experts have suggested that China is in a league of its own compared to the other BRIC countries. As David Rothkopf wrote in Foreign Policy, "Without China, the BRICs are just the BRI, a bland, soft cheese that is primarily known for the whine [sic] that goes with it. China is the muscle of the group and the Chinese know it. They have effective veto power over any BRIC initiatives because without them, who cares really? They are the one with the big reserves. They are the biggest potential market. They are the U.S. partner in the G2 (imagine the coverage a G2 meeting gets vs. a G8 meeting) and the E2 (no climate deal without them) and so on." Deutsche Bank Research said in a report that "economically, financially and politically, China overshadows and will continue to overshadow the other BRICs". It added that China's economy is larger than that of the three other BRIC economies (Brazil, Russia, and India) combined. Moreover, China's exports and its official foreign-exchange reserves are more than twice as large as those of the other BRICs combined. In that perspective, some pension investment experts have argued that "China alone accounts for more than 70% of the combined GDP growth generated by the BRIC countries [from 1999 to 2010]: if there is a BRIC miracle it's first and foremost a Chinese one". The "growth gap" between China and other large emerging economies such as Brazil, Russia and India can be attributed to a large extent to China's early focus on ambitious infrastructure projects: while China invested roughly 9% of its GDP on infrastructure in the 1990s and 2000s, most emerging economies invested only 2% to 5% of their GDP. This considerable spending gap allowed the Chinese economy to grow at near-optimal conditions while many South American and South Asian economies suffered from various development bottlenecks (poor transportation, aging power grids, mediocre schools).

Other critics suggest that BRIC is nothing more than a neat acronym for the four largest emerging market economies, but in economic and political terms nothing else (apart from the fact that they are all big emerging markets) links the four. Two are manufacturing-based economies and big importers (China and India), but two are huge exporters of natural resources (Brazil and Russia). The Economist, in its special report on Brazil, expressed the following view: "In some ways, Brazil is the steadiest of the BRICs. Unlike China and Russia, it is a full-blooded democracy; unlike India, it has no serious disputes with its neighbors. It is the only BRIC without a nuclear bomb". The Heritage Foundation's "Economic Freedom Index", which measures factors such as protection of property rights and free trade ranks Brazil ("moderately free") above the other BRICs ("mostly unfree"). Henry Kissinger has stated that the BRIC nations have no hope of acting together as a coherent bloc in world affairs and that any cooperation will be the result of forces acting on the individual nations.

In a not-so-subtle dig critical of the term as nothing more than a shorthand for emerging markets generally, critics have suggested a correlating term, CEMENT (Countries in Emerging Markets Excluded by New Terminology). Whilst they accept there has been spectacular growth of the BRIC economies, these gains have largely been the result of the strength of emerging markets generally, and that strength comes through having BRICs and CEMENT.

Based on IMF's World Economic Outlook Database, October 2016, the top economies in 2021 (by projected nominal gross domestic product (GDP)) are going to be China, the U.S., India, Japan, Germany, Russia, Indonesia, Brazil, the U.K., and France respectively. Nowadays Indonesia is not BRIC country, but as solely emerging economies in the list sets on seven in projected 2021 top economies. There are no South Africa and no (South Korea, Mexico, (GCC Arab countries—Saudi Arabia, Qatar, Kuwait, Bahrain, Oman and the United Arab Emirates), Eastern Europe and Turkey) as mentioned above.

Proposed inclusions
Mexico and South Korea are currently the world's 13th and 15th largest by nominal GDP just behind the BRIC and G7 economies. Both are experiencing rapid GDP growth of 5% every year, a figure comparable to Brazil from the original BRICs. Jim O'Neill, expert from the same bank and creator of the economic thesis, stated that in 2001 when the paper was created, it did not consider Mexico, but today it has been included because the country is experiencing the same factors that the other countries first included present. While South Korea was not originally included in the BRICs, recent solid economic growth led to Goldman Sachs proposing to add Mexico and South Korea to the BRICs, changing the acronym to BRIMCK, with Jim O'Neill pointing out that Korea "is better placed than most others to realize its potential due to its growth-supportive fundamentals". Again Jim O'Neil recently created the term MIKT that stands for Mexico, Indonesia, South Korea, and Turkey.

A Goldman Sachs paper published later in December 2005 explained why Mexico and South Korea were not included in the original BRICs. According to the paper, among the other countries they looked at, only Mexico and South Korea have the potential to rival the BRICs, but they are economies that they decided to exclude initially because they looked to them as already more developed. However, due to the popularity of the Goldman Sachs thesis, "BRIMC" and "BRICK" are becoming more generic marketing terms to refer to these six countries.

In their paper "BRICs and Beyond", Goldman Sachs stated that "Mexico, the four BRIC countries and South Korea should not be really thought of as emerging markets in the classical sense", adding that they are a "critical part of the modern globalised economy" and "just as central to its functioning as the current G7".

The term is primarily used in the economic and financial spheres as well as in academia. Its usage has grown specially in the investment sector, where it is used to refer to the bonds emitted by these emerging markets governments.

Mexico

Primarily, along with the BRICs, Goldman Sachs argues that the economic potential of Brazil, Russia, India, Mexico and China is such that they may become (with the United States) the six most dominant economies by 2050. Due to Mexico's rapidly advancing infrastructure, increasing middle class and rapidly declining poverty rates it is expected to have a higher GDP per capita than all but three European countries by 2050, this newfound local wealth also contributes to the nation's economy by creating a large domestic consumer market which in turn creates more jobs.

South Korea
South Korea is one of the world's most highly developed countries and including it with developing countries like the BRICs is not deemed correct. However, commentators such as William Pesek from Bloomberg argue that Korea is "Another 'BRIC' in Global Wall", suggesting that it stands out from the Next Eleven economies with its BRIC-like growth rate, despite its Human Development Index being higher than some of the world's most advanced economies, including France, UK, Austria, Denmark, Finland and Belgium. South Korean workers are the wealthiest among major Asian countries, with a higher income than Japan and the strongest growth rate in the OECD. More importantly, it has a significantly higher Growth Environment Score (Goldman Sachs' way of measuring the long-term sustainability of growth) than all of the BRICs or N-11s. According to the IMF, South Korea's GDP measured by purchasing power parity is already larger than Canada and Spain. In terms of GDP per capita (PPP), South Korea overtook Spain in 2010. According to Citibank, South Korea will continue by overtaking Germany, Britain, Australia and Sweden by 2020, surpassing Canada, Switzerland, Netherlands and Norway by 2030 and taking over the United States by 2040 to become the world's wealthiest major economy. While measuring the South Korean economy by nominal GDP is inaccurate as the South Korean won is artificially kept low to boost exports, IMF predicts South Korea's nominal GDP and GDP per capita will surpass Spain in 2015. Economists from other investment firms argue that even when measured by nominal GDP per capita, South Korea will achieve over $145,000 in 2040, surpassing the United States, suggesting that wealth is more important than size for bond investors, stating that Korea's credit rating will be rated AAA sooner than 2050.

United Korea

In September 2009, Goldman Sachs published its 188th Global Economics Paper named "A United Korea?" which highlighted in detail the potential economic power of a United Korea, which will surpass all current G7 countries except the United States and Japan within 30–40 years of reunification, estimating GDP to surpass $6 trillion by 2050. The young, skilled labor and large amount of natural resources from the North combined with advanced technology, infrastructure and large amount of capital in the South, as well as Korea's strategic location connecting three economic powers, is likely going to create an economy larger than the bulk of the G7. According to some opinions, a reunited Korea could occur before 2050. If it occurred, Korean reunification would immediately raise the country's population to over 70 million.

Current leaders

See also
 List of country groupings
 List of multilateral free-trade agreements
 Potential superpower
 Emerging markets
 Emerging and growth-leading economies
 North American Union
 List of countries by GDP (nominal)
 List of countries by average wage
 List of countries by future GDP (PPP) estimates

Notes

References

Bibliography
 Elder, Miriam, and Leahy, Joe, et al., Who's who: Bric leaders take their place at the top table, Financial Times, London, September 25, 2008
 Firzli, M. Nicolas, "Forecasting the Future: The BRICs and the China Model", JTW/ USAK Research Center, Mar 9 2011
 Kateb, Alexandre, Les nouvelles puissances mondiales. Pourquoi les BRIC changent le monde" (The new global powers. Why the BRIC change the world) (in French), Paris : Ellipses, 2011, 272 p.  
 O'Neill, Jim, BRICs could point the way out of the Economic Mire, Financial Times, London, September 23, 2008, p. 28.
 Mark Kobayashi-Hillary, 'Building a Future with BRICs: The Next Decade for Offshoring' (Nov 2007). .
 James D. Sidaway (2012) 'Geographies of Development: New Maps, New Visions?', The Professional Geographer, 64:1, 49-62.
 J. Vercueil, Les pays émergents. Brésil-Russie-Inde-Chine... Mutations économiques et nouveaux défis (Emerging Countries. Brazil - Russia - India - China... Economic Transformations and new Challenges) (in French), Paris : Bréal, 2010, 207 p. 
 Paulo Borba Casella, "BRIC : Brésil, Russie, Inde, Chine et Afrique du Sud - A l'heure d'un nouvel ordre juridique international, éd. A.Pedone, Paris, Sept. 2011, EAN

External links
 The Sino-Brazilian Principles in a Latin American and BRICS Context: The Case for Comparative Public Budgeting Legal Research Wisconsin International Law Journal, 13 May 2015
 Centre for Rising Powers, University of Cambridge
Russian President Putin planning to glue together the most powerful superpower coalition in the world 
Putin: The Father of BRIC
The Creation of Clubs: The BRIC 
Gorbachev, Not O'Neill, Deserves BRIC Credit
Insights on the Iran deal, BRICS and handling a crisis in Venezuela

BRICS
2000s economic history
Brazil–India relations
Economic country classifications
Foreign relations of Brazil
Foreign relations of India
Foreign relations of China
Multilateral relations of Russia

es:BRICS